The Music Never Stopped: Roots of the Grateful Dead is a 1995 compilation album of songs, performed by the original artists, that the American rock group the Grateful Dead covered and performed live throughout their career.  Several of the tracks on this album can be found on no other compact disc, including "Rain and Snow" as performed by Obray Ramsey and "Big Railroad Blues" by Cannon's Jug Stompers.  The eclectic nature of the Grateful Dead's music is highlighted on this album with the inclusion of songs from such diverse genres as folk ("Morning Dew", "Goin' Down This Road Feelin' Bad"),  the blues ("The Red Rooster", "Turn On Your Love Light"), country ("Mama Tried", "El Paso"), gospel ("Samson & Delilah"), and straight out rock and roll ("The Promised Land", "Not Fade Away").

Cover and title 
The cover, drawn by underground cartoonist Robert Crumb, depicts some of the artists appearing on the album performing to skeletal Deadheads.

The title comes from the song "The Music Never Stopped" from the Grateful Dead album Blues for Allah.

Track listing

Credits 
Produced by Henry Kaiser and David Gans
Mastered by Paul Stubblebine
Notes by Blair Jackson
Front cover design by R. Crumb
Art direction by Joan Pelosi

References 

 The Music Never Stopped on deaddisc.com
 Hilburn, Robert. "Roots of Cash's Hit Tunes", Los Angeles Times, August 22, 2006
 Strauss, Neil. "The Pop Life", The New York Times, October 19, 1995

 

1995 compilation albums
Blues compilation albums
Country rock compilation albums
Folk rock compilation albums
Grateful Dead